Chair (Latin cathedra, Greek kathedra, "seat", Polish katedra) is an equivalent of an academic department in Poland, Russia and the Czech Republic, a division of a university or school faculty devoted to a particular academic discipline. Originally, a cathedra is the chair or throne of a bishop, a symbol of the bishop's teaching authority in the Roman Catholic Church.

University organisation in Poland comprises the following units:
University (Uniwersytet)
Faculty (Wydział)
Institute (Instytut)
Chair (Katedra)
Department (Zakład)
Research group (Pracownia, Zespół)

Usually degree programmes are conducted within the framework of institutes. However, some specialised programmes may be conducted by independent chairs, while programmes with large variety of disciplines involved (especially medical and legal studies) may be conducted directly by a faculty — in this case, faculty may be composed of chairs with no institutes in its structure. Interdepartmental individual programmes exist at some universities, where a programme of studies is agreed individually with student's supervisor and courses from various faculties, institutes and chairs are available.

Academia in Poland

he:קתדרה (אקדמיה)
pl:Katedra_(jednostka_organizacyjna)